Bajawa is a town of Flores, Indonesia and the capital of the Ngada Regency.  Ngada Regency is part of East Nusa Tenggara province and located to the east of Ruteng. 

Bajawa features natural hot springs which are used for bathing and volcanic scenery due to the proximity of the Inierie Volcano.  The population is primarily Roman Catholic.

Transportation
The town is served by two minor airports:
 Bajawa Soa Airport
 Bajawa Pahdamaleda Airport

Climate
Bajawa has a cool tropical savanna climate (Aw) with moderate to little rainfall from May to October and heavy to very heavy rainfall from November to April.

References

Flores Island (Indonesia)
Regency seats of East Nusa Tenggara

External links
Bajawa Travel Guide Information